Adeel Chaudhry is a Pakistani-Canadian singer-songwriter and actor. He has worked in Hindi & Urdu films & television. Apart from acting, Adeel has also released two studio albums.

Life and career
Originally from Kharian, he studied dentistry at King Edward Medical University. Adeel began his career as a model and actor and did his first theatre play named KUKAR with Food connoisseur, Adeel Chaudry now the owner of Junoon Restaurant. He appeared in television commercials for Pepsi in India. Adeel made his debut as a television actor by appearing in the serial Yeh Zindagi Hai in 2008, and, then, he signed to Tips Industries Limited. Adeel also sang  "Move Your Body" for the 2008 Bollywood film Kismat Konnection, which won the MTV Popular Choice Award. He released his debut album "Koi Chehra" in 2009 under Tips. He released his second album "Raat Ruk Jaa" in 2013. Adeel also appeared in a television commercial with Shah Rukh Khan for the tobacco brand Pan Parag. In 2014, Adeel appeared in the Bollywood horror film Bhaangarh, which was released on 5 September 2014. He appeared in the romantic-musical film Rhythm (2016), his Bollywood debut. The dapper hero starred alongside Komal Aziz in Bharosa Pyar Tera. The serial became a highly rated drama during its run in 2019.

Albums

Filmography

Films

Television

See also
 List of Pakistani actors
 List of Bollywood actors

References

External links
 
 
 
 

Living people
Pakistani male film actors
Pakistani male television actors
King Edward Medical University alumni
People from Lahore
Pakistani dentists
Pakistani male models
Pakistani male singer-songwriters
1988 births